Teloglabrus is a genus of stalk-eyed flies in the family Diopsidae.

Species
T. australis Feijen, 1983
T. curvipes Feijen, 1983
T. duplospinosus Feijen, 1983
T. entabensis Feijen, 1983
T. lebombensis Feijen, 1983
T. londti Feijen, 1983
T. milleri Feijen, 1983
T. pelecyformis Feijen, 1983
T. prolongatus Feijen, 1983
T. sabiensis Feijen, 1983
T. sanorum Feijen, 1983
T. stuckenbergi Feijen, 1983
T. trituberculatus Feijen, 1983
T. tsitsikamensis Feijen, 1983
T. vumbensis Feijen, 1983

References

Diopsidae
Diptera of Africa
Diopsoidea genera